Adurothrips is a genus of thrips in the family Phlaeothripidae, first described by Laurence Mound in 1994. There is just one species in this genus: Adurothrips atopus. The species is wingless and breeds in leaf litter in New South Wales, Queensland and South Australia.

References

Phlaeothripidae
Thrips genera
Insects described in 1994
Taxa named by Laurence Alfred Mound